Acheilognathus gracilis is a species of ray-finned fish in the genus Acheilognathus. It is endemic to China.

References

Acheilognathus
Cyprinid fish of Asia
Fish described in 1926
Freshwater fish of China